USCGC Vigilant may refer to:

, was commissioned in 1927 and decommissioned in 1966
, is a  commissioned in 1964 and currently in service

See also
 for ships of the US Revenue Cutter Service
 for ships of the US Navy

Note
Ships of the US Revenue Cutter Service and the US Coast Guard were often placed under the authority of the US Navy during times of war.

United States Coast Guard ship names